The 1958 NCAA Swimming and Diving Championships  were contested in March 1958 at the Intramural Sports Building at the University of Michigan in Ann Arbor, Michigan at the 22nd annual NCAA-sanctioned swim meet to determine the team and individual national champions of men's collegiate swimming and diving in the United States. 

Michigan retained the national title, the Wolverines' eighth (and second consecutive), after finishing nine points ahead of Yale in the team standings.

Team results
Note: Top 10 only
(H) = Hosts
Full results

See also
List of college swimming and diving teams

References

NCAA Division I Men's Swimming and Diving Championships
NCAA Swimming And Diving Championships
NCAA Swimming And Diving Championships
NCAA Swimming And Diving Championships
Sports in Ann Arbor, Michigan